Research Medical Center - Brookside Campus is an outpatient hospital located in the Brookside neighborhood of Kansas City, Missouri at 6601 Rockhill Road. It is part of the HCA Midwest Division.

Hospital Background
Research Medical Center - Brookside Campus was originally established as Baptist Memorial Hospital in 1945. It merged with Trinity Lutheran Hospital in 2001 to form Baptist-Lutheran Medical Center. HCA Healthcare took ownership of Baptist-Lutheran Medical Center in 2003 as part of its purchase of Midwest Health. The emergency department and outpatient services remained open, and the facility was renamed Research Medical Center - Brookside Campus to show that it had become a satellite facility of Research Medical Center. In 2016, it was announced that the old hospital tower would be converted into a senior continuum-of-care community.

References

 Leadership will change at Baptist-Lutheran - 3/28/06
 Hospital transplants idea from academic med centers - 2/9/07
 HCA spine centers intend to make care less of a pain - 2/8/08
 Vernegaard resigns as Research CEO - 5/10/06
 OP Regional's CEO takes top job at Research - 7/27/06
 Research Med Center offers liver, pancreas institute - 9/6/06

Hospitals in Kansas City, Missouri
Buildings and structures in Kansas City, Missouri
HCA Healthcare